Fort Augustus was a railway station in Inverness-shire, Scotland on the Invergarry and Fort Augustus Railway between 1903 and 1946.

Overview 
The station was opened on 22 July 1903 situated to the west of Fort Augustus on the banks of Loch Ness. The company provided two terminus platforms and one through platform for services to Fort Augustus pier. The station also contained a water column and turntable.

The station was operated by the Highland Railway from 1903 to 1907, and then by the North British Railway until 1922. From 1923 it was operated by the London and North Eastern Railway.

The Highland Railway appointed Hugh Fraser as stationmaster in 1903. In 1910 J.C. Craig was appointed stationmaster.

Passenger services were withdrawn on 1 December 1933  and the station was closed in 1946.

References

External links
 Fort Augustus station on navigable O. S. map

  
  

Disused railway stations in Highland (council area)
Former North British Railway stations
Railway stations in Great Britain opened in 1903
Railway stations in Great Britain closed in 1911
Railway stations in Great Britain opened in 1913
Railway stations in Great Britain closed in 1933